The Madame X Tour was the eleventh concert tour by American singer Madonna, in support of her fourteenth studio album, Madame X (2019). It began on September 17, 2019, at New York City's BAM Howard Gilman Opera House, and ended on March 8, 2020, at Paris Grand Rex. An all-theater tour, it was the singer's first time playing small venues since The Virgin Tour (1985); she had previously shown interest in doing a smaller-scale show during a 2017 interview. The tour consisted exclusively of dates in the United States, United Kingdom, France and Portugal; mobile phones and smart watches were banned from the concerts, which was met with mixed reactions from fans. 

The tour was met with positive reviews from critics, although the inclusion of Madame X album cuts garnered some criticism. Controversy arose due to Madonna's late show starts, with a fan going as far as to file a class action lawsuit against her. At the 2020 Billboard year-end boxscore charts, it was reported that Madame X had grossed over $36,385,935 from an audience of 124,655. 

After several cancellations due to a recurring knee injury, the tour ended abruptly three days before its planned end date, following on from the French government announcing a ban on gatherings of more than 1,000 people to curb the spread of COVID-19 in the midst of the ongoing pandemic.  Shot during the Lisbon dates, the concert film Madame X was directed by Ricardo Gomes, Sasha Kasiuha, and Nuno Xico. It had its premiere on September 23 at New York's Times Square Edition Hotel, and was released through Paramount+ on October 8, 2021.

Background and development 
In 2017, Madonna relocated to Lisbon when seeking a top football academy for her son David Banda, who wanted to become a professional association football player. While living in the city, she began meeting artists; painters and musicians who would invite her to "living room sessions." In the sessions, they would bring food and sit around the table, and musicians would start playing instruments, singing fado and samba music. The singer's fourteenth studio album Madame X was released on June 14, 2019; it became Madonna's ninth number-one album on the Billboard 200. Prior to the album's release, the singer had expressed the idea of going on tour during a backstage interview at the 2019 Billboard Music Awards. During a 2017 interview with BBC News Madonna had mentioned the possibility of doing a smaller-scale show; "I've done so many shows—world tours, stadiums, arenas, you name it—that I feel like I have to reinvent that now too. I like doing intimate shows and being able to talk directly to the audience." The Madame X Tour was officially announced by the singer on May 6, 2019, through her official Twitter account, where she posted a short promotional video co-starring Diplo. It visited smaller venues as the singer liked, in her own words, "the idea of staying in one place and people coming to me." It marked the first time Madonna played theaters and small venues since 1985's The Virgin Tour.

Mobile phones and smart watches were banned from the concerts; attendees were required to put their devices in pouches ahead of each show. A source explained that "[Madonna] wants to have an intimate experience with her audience without phones up in the air and screens separating fans from the performance." Fans online complained of the "stress" of the ban, while others said it made for a "good concert experience." In a telephone interview with Mario Lopez for Megaphone, Madonna said the set list would be 70% new material. Jamie King was appointed creative director; personnel working on the tour included 41 musicians, Monte Pittman on guitar, backup singer Dana "Yahzarah" Williams, 12 dancers, and 14 of the 22 women of the Batukadeiras Orchestra.

Stufish provided the show’s sets, which include mapped video projection, large-scale video images, staircases, and other reconfigurable scenic pieces that were compared to a Rubik's Cube. The wardrobe included a glittery Revolutionary War attire with feathered tricorne hat and a chiffon dress, with frills and Swarovski crystals designed by Francesco Scognamiglio. Additional articles were provided by Prada, Burberry, Miu Miu, and Versace. For the performance of "Frozen" (1998), Luigi & Iango filmed a "dramatic" black and white video of Madonna's eldest daughter Lourdes Leon as a "shape-shifting spirit who finds her freedom through her movements." A week before the tour kicked off, a pop-up store was announced in New York; it counted with exclusive merchandise such as signed vinyls, signed and framed art prints, hand-painted hoodies, and tees. The store also had a make-up counter with artists available each day, an interactive photo booth, and a station where shoppers could add embroidery to their items. The Madame X Tour officially began on September 17, 2019, at New York City's BAM Howard Gilman Opera House, and ended on March 8, 2020, at Paris Grand Rex.

Concert synopsis 
The show began with a quote by James Baldwin: "Art is here to prove that all safety is an illusion... Artists are here to disturb the peace." Then, a silhouetted woman sat at a typewriter; each key press sounding like a gunshot, accompanied by a dancer jerking and flinching as if he had been shot. Madonna then appeared to sing "God Control" while being bounced between two police officers’ shields. The number had cops attacking dancers under a video montage of news footage. "Dark Ballet" was performed next, with Joan of Arc references and the singer fighting dancers in gas masks reminiscent of the mice in The Nutcracker (1892); it counted with a ballet breakdown halfway through. Afterwards, Madonna yelled "Fuck the patriarchy!" before being dragged by dancers dressed as policemen into a circular cell in the stage. This led to a rendition of "Human Nature", as pointing fingers were projected across the stage. Towards the end, she played a bongo solo and was surrounded by 11 black women − including her twin daughters Stella, Estere, and Mercy James − and chanted the phrase "I'm not your bitch!" An a capella rendition of "Express Yourself" and a brief interlude where Madonna addressed the audience followed.

"Vogue" and "I Don't Search I Find" were performed with lookalike dancers dressed in blonde wigs, trench coats, shades, and high heels. Next, Madonna sang the first verse and chorus of "Papa Don't Preach"; she changed the lyric "I'm keeping my baby" to "I'm not keeping my baby". Afterwards, she played guitar for "American Life" while uniforms fell down from above the stage, and dancers dressed as soldiers dragged a coffin. A short video led to "Batuka", which had 14 women of the Batukadeiras Orchestra playing the drums while Madonna sat to the side on a stairwell, before eventually joining them and doing batuque moves. What came next were performances of Isabel De Oliveira's "Fado Pechincha", and Madame X album tracks "Killers Who are Partying" and "Crazy" - the last one was played with an accordion. A cha-cha-chá mashup of "La Isla Bonita" and a new song called "Welcome to My Fado Club" was performed next, followed by a guitar rendition of Cesária Évora's "Sodade". The next numbers were "Medellín", with Maluma appearing on the backdrop screens, and album track "Extreme Occident". An interlude of dancers doing synchronized moves to lyrics of "Rescue Me" followed.

"Frozen" saw the singer performing in the middle of a massive projection of the video of Leon. For "Come Alive", Madonna and the dancers wore colorful flowing robes. She then played the piano for "Future" and was joined by dancers with red lights on their eyes; the word "Warning" flashed on the stage behind her as she sang. The Tracy Young remix of "Crave" featured Madonna dancing with her twin daughters, while "Like a Prayer" had her performing in front of an X-shaped staircase while surrounded by a choir and the song's music video projected on the stage. The final number, "I Rise", began with Emma González speech being presented on the screen, which then showed news footage of protests and marches. Halfway through, the screen turned the colors of the Rainbow flag as Madonna and her dancers left the stage through the audience with their fists raised.

Reception

Critical 
The Madame X Tour was met with positive reviews from critics; Rolling Stones Rob Sheffield deemed it "excellent" and a "testament to the genius in her madness", concluding that it proves "Madonna will never be the kind of superstar who repeats her successes, sticks to her strengths, or plays it safe. Instead, she's getting weirder with age. Thank all the angels and saints for that." Jon Pareles, writing for The New York Times, said on his review that "as both album and show, 'Madame X' is Madonna's latest declaration of a defiant, self-assured, flexible identity that's entirely comfortable with dualities [...] Yes, she is 61, but her music remains determinedly contemporary." Varietys Ilana Kaplan considered it "at times[,] performance art, a political rally, a comedy show, a church and even her home in Lisbon." Rhian Daly from NME gave the concert a particularly positive review by calling it "powerful, empowering, stunning", and "one of the best gigs of the year." Bradley Stern, for Paper, opined it was "unlike any other Madonna tour to date", as well as a "hybrid between an actual theatrical production and a concert." According to Pollstars Amy Linden, The Madame X Tour is an example of what is known within the music industry as an "underplay [...] when an A or maybe B+ level musician opts out of the de rigueur arena or shed tour in favor of a more intimate and modest venue [...] With Madame X, Madonna joins the ranks of an impressive list of musicians who have also turned the volume down, so to speak." Liden concluded that being able to see the singer in "such close proximity" added a "magical and elite vibe." 

Will Gompertz from BBC News gave the concert a five-star rating, and opined it was "perfectly imperfect, like one of those sketchy landscapes by Cezanne where you can see his underdrawings and misplaced lines, making it so much more beautiful and real than Canaletto's soulless precision." Gompertz concluded his review by saying Madame X was an "adventurous piece of contemporary theatre, and a match for any of the Tony and Olivier-winning shows currently playing the West End and Broadway."

Aidin Vaziri from the San Francisco Chronicle noted how, even though the singer was "battling a cold, suffering from a torn ligament and had a bad knee", she still put on a "spectacular show." For Las Vegas Weekly, Josh Bell considered it, despite the smaller venues, "every bit as majestic as Madonna's arena tours." The performances were also praised; Bell highlighted "Human Nature" and "American Life" for fitting "best with the theme of defiance", and "Like a Prayer" for being "every bit as awe-inspiring and empowering as when it was first released." LA Weeklys Brett Callwood singled out the "gorgeous rendition" of "Frozen" and the "hair-raising" "Like a Prayer". Stern felt the singer had recreated performances from the past: he saw "American Life" as a "minimized version" of the Re-Invention World Tour (2004) performance; "Vogue" and "I Don't Search I Find" recalled Madonna's appearance at Stonewall 50 – WorldPride NYC 2019; "Dark Ballet" and "Like a Prayer" were "essentially the same stairwell-style set up" of both the Met Gala and Eurovision performances, and "Medellín" was "more or less a recreation of her 2019 Billboard Awards performance." Leslie Katz, writing for the San Francisco Examiner, considered "Batuka" "the evening's most joyous number." For Digital Journal, Markos Papadatos singled out the rendition of "Crave" as "sheer bliss", and considered "Like a Prayer" the "anthem for the night" that earned the singer a "lengthy standing ovation."

The inclusion of Madame X album cuts was met with both criticism and praise; Kaplan said it was "almost cruel" that singles such as "Papa Don't Preach" and "Express Yourself" were "cut to under a minute", while the album tracks were performed on its entirety. For Philadelphias Victor Fiorillo, there was "too much [Madame X] material — some of it straight-up filler — and presented in such a meandering way, that any sense of flow, arc, or climax was continuously undermined." Rob Sheffield applauded the inclusion of album tracks, as he felt they "work much better in a theater setting." Daly opined that the singer looked happiest when she was "paying tribute to the musicians and sounds that inspired her to make that record" rather than "her wealth of classics." From Consequence, Michael Roffman felt the singer's "self-deprecating and brazenly honest" behavior was "far more riveting than hearing fucking 'Into the Groove' again."

In more critical reviews, Selena Fragassi from the Chicago Sun-Times opined that, although the singer "relied way too heavily on Auto-Tune, and her intimate between-act stage banter was incredibly bizarre and disjointed [...] when she was on stage all eyes were glued to her." Entertainment Weeklys Leah Greenblatt wrote: "The show is hardly without flaws: her political messaging, though heartfelt, is often clumsily on the nose, and several set projections leaned toward the community-theater end of things." Leslie Katz classified Madame X as "paradoxically both charming and offputting [...] Although [the] setting was smaller than the arenas she's filled during her decades as the world's biggest pop star, it was hardly an intimate or casual affair." Mikael Wood, from the Los Angeles Times, expressed, "for Madonna, intimate doesn't necessarily mean focused. Like the Madame X album [...] the opening Wiltern concert was a bit of a mess." Fiorillo wrote that "the theater of Madonna just doesn't work as a piece of theater, and great theater is clearly what she is trying to achieve." He felt the show could have benefited from "a real director [...] somebody who [...] could transform the show from a concert with some really cool theatrical elements into an evening of beautiful theater." The Odyssey's Rocco Papa felt that "[Madonna] tried to shrink a stadium show and fit it in a small theater." He also felt the final result lacked real intimacy and criticized the absence of the singer's past material from the set list. The staff of Billboard named the Madame X Tour one of the best live shows of 2019.

Commercial 
The first tickets and VIP packages were allotted to the members of Icon, Madonna's official fan club; price for entrances ranged from $60 to $760. Additionally, fans were given the opportunity to purchase tickets at $10 through the singer's official website. Due to an "overwhelming demand", more concerts were announced in New York and Los Angeles the same day the tour was officially confirmed. In October, Billboard reported that the first 16 dates had grossed $9.6 million and sold over 31,401 tickets. At the 2020 Billboard year-end boxscore charts, it was reported that the Madame X Tour had raked in $36,385,935 from an audience of 124,655; additionally, the shows at the London Palladium were ranked on the seventh position of the top 25 Boxscore of the year, with $9,816,383 grossed.

Tardiness backlash and cancellations 

Madonna's tardiness was widely criticized. In Las Vegas, she took the stage at 12:30am when the concert was scheduled to start at 10:30pm; she then told the audience: "A queen is never late." This was met with backlash from fans, who demanded a refund and deemed her attitude "condescending and alienating." A man from Florida named Nate Hollander went as far as to file a class action lawsuit against Madonna after the Miami concert he planned to attend was pushed back by two hours to accommodate the singer's tardiness. "Ticketholders had to work and go to school the next day, which prevented them from attending a concert that would end at around 1:00 a.m.", the lawsuit read. Hollander then attempted to obtain a refund for the three entrances he had purchased but was unsuccessful. Due to the singer's late appearance for the February 5, 2020, concert in London, the show went over the Palladium's 11pm curfew, causing the venue to pull the curtains down on the concert. The final song, "I Rise", was performed with the lights and Madonna's microphone switched off. She claimed it was "5 minutes past our 11:00 curfew" and accused the venue of trying to "censor" her and of "pulling down the metal fire curtain that weighs nine tonnes." The venue denied having used the fire curtain, but did not directly comment on the show being cut short. Madonna then posted a video on Instagram showing her swearing from behind the curtain, before eventually returning to perform "I Rise".

Following the cancellation of the last North American concert, the singer took to Instagram and talked about the "indescribable" pain caused by an injury: "As I climbed the ladder to sing 'Batuka' on Saturday night in Miami I was in tears from the pain of my injuries [...] With every song I sang, I said a prayer that I would make it to the next and get thru  the show [...] However this time I have to listen to my body and accept that my pain is a warning I want to say how deeply sorry I am to all my fans." After several cancellations due to the recurring injury, the tour ended abruptly three days before its planned final date, after the French government announced a ban on gatherings of more than 1,000 people to curb the spread of COVID-19 in the midst of the ongoing pandemic.

Documentary 

On February 18, 2021, ¡Hola! reported that Madonna would release a documentary film with behind-the-scenes footage from the tour exclusively through Netflix. A source said the project would depict the Madame X Tour "for the spectacle that it was", revealing how the singer "quite literally put blood, sweat and tears into [the concert]." The article also said Madonna was "incredibly involved", having spent weeks "watching previews and helping to edit the footage at home." That same month, it was reported that Madonna was re-shooting scenes for the film. On July 15, 2021, it was announced that the documentary would premiere exclusively through Paramount+ on Friday October 8; it would be available for subscribers in North and South America, Australia, and the Nordics. The film made its television debut on October 7, when it aired on MTV UK.

Shot during the Lisbon concerts and directed by Ricardo Gomes, Sasha Kasiuha, and Nuno Xico, Madame X had its premiere on September 23 at New York's Times Square Edition Hotel; Madonna herself attended the event. Reviews were generally positive: The Guardians Alexis Petridis deemed it "beautifully shot", while according to NMEs Nick Levine it "proves the Queen of Pop is still in her prime." On a more mixed review, Owen Gleiberman from Variety opined the documentary is "heavy on message" but "light in euphoria." To promote the release, Madonna gave a surprise performance in the basement of Marcus Samuelsson's Harlem restaurant Red Rooster.

Set list 
The following set list was obtained from the concert held on October 16, 2019, at the Chicago Theatre. It does not represent all concerts for the duration of the tour.

Act I
 "God Control"
 "Dark Ballet"
 "Human Nature"
 "Express Yourself" 
 "Papa Don't Preach" 
Act II
 "Madame X Manifesto" 
 "Vogue"
 "I Don't Search I Find"
 "Papa Don't Preach"
 "American Life"
Act III
 "Batuka" 
 "Fado Pechincha" 
 "Killers Who Are Partying"
 "Crazy"
 "Welcome to My Fado Club" 
"Sodade" 
 "Medellín"
 "Extreme Occident"
Act IV
 "Rescue Me" 
 "Frozen"
 "Come Alive"
 "Future"
Act V
 "Crave" 
 "Like a Prayer"
Encore
 "I Rise"

Shows

Cancelled dates

Notes

Personnel 
Credits adapted from Madonna's official website.

Show
Created and directed by Madonna
Jamie King – creative producer
Megan Lawson – co-director and lead choreographer
Damien Jalet – creative advisor and choreographer
Luigi Murenu & Iango Henzi – creative consultants
Carla Kama – associate creative producer
Tiffany Olson – associate creative producer
Stephanie Roos – associate creative producer
Al Gurdon – lighting designer
Stufish Entertainment Architects – set design

Band
Madonna – vocals, piano, guitar
Kevin Antunes – musical director
Monte Pittman – guitar
Gaspar Varela – Portuguese guitar
Rickey Pageot – piano, accordion and percussion
Jéssica Pina – trumpet and background vocalist
Adelmiro "Miroca" Paris – percussion and guitar
Carlos Mil-Homens – percussion
Francesca Dardani – violin
Célia Hatton – viola
Mariko Muranaka – cello
Andrea "Munchie" Lanz – background vocalist
Dana "Yahzarah" Williams – background vocalist

Performers
Ahlamalik Williams – dancer
Marvin Gofin – dancer
Mccall Olsen – dancer
Baylie Olsen – dancer
Allaune Blegbo – dancer
Sasha Mallory – dancer
Loic Mabanza – dancer
Daniele Sibili – dancer
Sierra Herrera-Grey – dancer
Chaz Buzan – dancer
Nicolas Huchard – dancer
Ai Shimatsu – M stand in

Batukadeiras
Jussara Spencer
Anastásia Carvalho
Edna Oliveira
Jéssica Eliane Tavares
Irina Paula Carvalho
Darlene Barreto
Cátia Ramos
Antónia Tavares
Keila Cabral
Ellah Barbosa
Iara Xavier Santos
Jacira Duarte
Etelvina "Bianina" Tavares
Idilsa Tavares

Choreographers
Megan Lawson
Matt Cady
Marvin Gofin
Damien Jalet
Nicolas Huchard
Baylie Olsen
Mccall Olsen
Ahlamalik Williams
Derrell Bullock

Assistant choreographers
Nicolas Huchard
Amilios Arapoglou
Sierra Herrera
Allaune Blegbo

Costume department
Eyob Yohannes – costume designer
Taryn Shumway – assistant costume designer
Timothy Chernyaev – assistant costume designer
Mae Heidenreich – assistant costume designer
Aliyah Christmas – assistant costume designer
Amanda Kai – costume department coordinator
Samuel Ososki – tailor
Michael Velasquez – tailor
Anthony Garcia – tailor
Kenberly Pierre-Paul – costume assistant
Raquel Castellanos – assistant
Robert Christie – costume sketcher
Lisa Krizner-George – cutter
Thayne Whitney – stitcher/patternmaker
Ke Cindy – seamstress
Teri Lloyd – seamstress
Sandra Nieto – seamstress
Ivanova Mariano – seamstress
Mallory Rinker – seamstress
Olga Kim – tailoring
Izabella Litvak – tailoring
Aris Bordo – tailoring
Noelle Rasco – stitching
Arielle Crawford – stitching
Anna Kate Reep – stitching

Live Nation
Arthur Fogel – tour promoter and producer
Gerry Barad – associate promoter
Tres Thomas – tour director
Colleen Cozart – production accountant

The Team
Andy Lecompte – hair stylist for Madonna
Aaron Henrikson – make-up artist for Madonna
Tony Villanueva – head dresser
Diogo Gonçalves – assistant
Corvett Hunt – hair stylist
Kamilah Gerestant – braider
Justin Heslop – makeup artist

Tour crew
Jason "JD" Danter – production manager
Brian Wares – stage manager
Mike Morobitto – theatrical stage manager
Emma Cederblad – production coordinator
Harry Forster – lighting director
Oli James – lighting crew chief
James Jones III – lighting tech
Mike Rothwell – lighting tech
Dave Baxter – lighting tech
Matt Levine – lighting tech
Jason "Lew Lew" Lewis – rigger
Sean Mullarkey – automation
Rod "Rawd" Van Egmond – head carpenter
Allen "A.J." Haley – carpenter
Eric Cardoza – props/carpenter
Tim Colvard – FOH engineer
Mike Dean – audio consultant
Sean Solymar – audio consultant
Demetrius Moore – M audio tech
Sean Spuehler – vocal mix engineer
Lauren D'elia – vocal mix engineer
Matt Napier – monitor engineer
Alistair "Ali" Viles – RF/audio engineer
Lee Fox-Furnell – monitor tech
Arno Voortman – audio system engineer
Robert "Bongo" Longo – head backline tech (keys)
Tommy Simpson – backline tech (strings)
Iain "Robbo" Robertson – backline tech (drums/percussion)
Dan Roe – programmer
Gemma Daly – ambiance
Allison Sulock – video server tech
Dany Lambert – video projectionist
Heken "Mel" Dykes – wardrobe supervisor
Candice Lawrence – wardrobe
Noriko Kakihara – wardrobe
Michael Velasquez – tailor

Video content
Danny Tull – video content director
Nuno Xico – editor
Russ Senzatimore – editor
Tom Watson – editor
Jerry Chia – editor
Ryan Drake – editor
Hamish Lyons – editor

Tour book design
Anya Lange

Tour book photography
Ricardo Gomes
Steven Klein

Participating designers
Elizabeth Manuel
Prada
Miu Miu
Burberry
Versace
Paula Rowan
Mugler
Agent Provocateur

References

External links 
Madonna.com > Tour
Madame X on Paramount+ 

2019 concert tours
2020 concert tours
Concert tours cancelled due to the COVID-19 pandemic
Madonna concert tours
Madame X (Madonna)